Rebecca Bulley (born 18 August 1982), also known as Rebecca Strachan, is a former Australia netball international. Between 2008 and 2015 she made 42 senior appearances for Australia. Bulley was a member of the Australia teams that won the gold medal at the 2015 Netball World Cup and the silver medal at the 2010 Commonwealth Games. Bulley also won three ANZ Championship titles with three different teams – the 2008 New South Wales Swifts, the 2013 Adelaide Thunderbirds and the 2015 Queensland Firebirds. She began her senior club career with Melbourne Kestrels during the Commonwealth Bank Trophy era and  finished it playing for Giants Netball in Suncorp Super Netball.

Early life, family and education
Bulley is the daughter of Leon and Lynley Strachan. She was born in Victoria and raised in the Pyramid Hill and Bendigo districts.  
She attended Pyramid Hill College and Bendigo Senior Secondary College. Her sister, Meredith Ball (née Strachan), also played netball for Melbourne Kestrels, Melbourne University Lightning and Sandhurst. Her younger brother, Kieran Strachan is an Australian rules footballer. Rebecca is married to Randall Bulley, a schoolteacher based in Wollongong. She gave birth to a daughter, Indie in 2016. The Bulley family home is in Woonona, New South Wales.

Playing career

Early years
As Rebecca Strachan, Bulley began her netball career as a junior with Calivil United in the Loddon Valley Football Netball League. Her mother, Lynley Strachan, coached at the Calivil United club. After her family moved to Bendigo, she switched to Sandhurst in the Bendigo Football Netball League. Her team mates at Sandhurst included her sister, Meredith.

Commonwealth Bank Trophy
Between 2000 and 2007, Bulley played 85 games for Melbourne Kestrels and AIS Canberra Darters in the Commonwealth Bank Trophy. She also captained both teams. Between 2001 and 2003 she also played for the Australian Institute of Sport.

ANZ Championship
New South Wales Swifts
Between 2008 and 2011, Bulley played for New South Wales Swifts in the ANZ Championship. After missing out on selection for the Melbourne Vixens squad, Bulley was encouraged by Liz Ellis to join Swifts. She was subsequently a member of the Swifts team that won the inaugural 2008 ANZ Championship title. At the end of the 2010 ANZ Championship season, Bulley was named the Holden Cruze ANZ Championship Player of the Year, the QBE NSW Swifts MVP and the NSW Swifts Members' Player of the Year.

Adelaide Thunderbirds
Between 2012 and 2014, Bulley played for Adelaide Thunderbirds. In 2013 she was a member of the Thunderbirds team won the ANZ Championship.

Queensland Firebirds
In 2015 Bulley played for Queensland Firebirds and finished the season with a third Championship winners medal.

Suncorp Super Netball
Giants Netball
Between  2017 and 2018, Bulley played for Giants Netball in the Suncorp Super Netball. Bulley had initially retired after the 2015 Netball World Cup in order to start a family. However, Giants head coach, Julie Fitzgerald, subsequently persuaded her to come out of retirement as an injury replacement for Kristiana Manu'a. In August 2018 Bulley announced her retirement as a player for the second time.

Australia
Between 2008 and 2015, Bulley made 42 senior appearances for Australia. From 2005 she was regularly featured in Australia squads, including the advance squad for the 2006 Commonwealth Games. However Bulley had to wait until 2008 before she made her Test debut. She made her senior debut on 20 September 2008 against New Zealand. She was subsequently a member of the Australia teams that won the silver medal at the 2010 Commonwealth Games and the gold medal at the 2015 Netball World Cup. She retired from international netball following the latter tournament.

Coaching career
During the 2019 Australian Netball League season Bulley served as an assistant coach with Canberra Giants. She was subsequently appointed head coach of Giants Netball Academy ahead of the 2020 season  Ahead of the 2021 Suncorp Super Netball season, Bulley was named as  assistant coach of New South Wales Swifts.

After the Queensland Firebirds coach left, Bulley was appointed head coach of the Queensaland Firebirds on a 4 year deal.

Honours

Australia
Netball World Cup
Winners: 2015
Commonwealth Games
Runners Up: 2010
Queensland Firebirds
ANZ Championship
Winners: 2015
Adelaide Thunderbirds
ANZ Championship
Winners: 2013
New South Wales Swifts
ANZ Championship
Winners: 2008
Individual
Holden Cruze ANZ Championship Player of the Year
Winner: 2010 
QBE NSW Swifts MVP
Winner: 2010 
NSW Swifts Members' Player of the Year
Winner: 2010

References

1982 births
Living people
Australian netball players
Australia international netball players
Commonwealth Games silver medallists for Australia
Netball players at the 2010 Commonwealth Games
Commonwealth Games medallists in netball
Australian Institute of Sport netball players
AIS Canberra Darters players
Melbourne Kestrels players
ANZ Championship players
New South Wales Swifts players
Adelaide Thunderbirds players
Queensland Firebirds players
Giants Netball players
Suncorp Super Netball players
Netball players from Victoria (Australia)
Australian netball coaches
Australian Netball League coaches
Australia international Fast5 players
South Australian Sports Institute netball players
New South Wales Swifts coaches
2015 Netball World Cup players
Medallists at the 2010 Commonwealth Games